is a Shinto shrine in the city of Nikkō, Tochigi Prefecture, Japan.  It is also known as Nikkō Futarasan Shrine, to distinguish it from the Utsunomiya Futarayama Jinja, which shares the same kanji in its name. Both shrines also claim the title of ichinomiya of former Shimotsuke Province. The main festival of the shrine is held annually from April 13 to April 17. The shrine consists of three geographically separate sections. The main shrine is located between Nikkō Tōshō-gū and the Taiyū-in Mausoleum. Many visitors go to all three, as well as to Rinnō-ji; which are part of the Shrines and Temples of Nikkō UNESCO World Heritage Site.  The "middle shrine" is located of the shore of Lake Chuzenji and the "inner shrine" is located at the summit of Mount Nantai, the volcano overlooking the lake. The shrine possesses two swords that are National treasures of Japan. Additionally, dozens of buildings and cultural artifacts are listed as National Important Cultural Properties. The precincts were also designated a National Historic Site.

Enshrined kami
The kami enshrined at Nikkō Futarasan Jinja are:
 , god of nation-building, agriculture, medicine, and protective magic
 , one of the three Munakata goddesses
 , god of agriculture and thunder

Overview
The precincts of the shrine include eight peaks of the Nikkō Mountains (Mt. Nantai, Mt. Nyōhō, Mt. Tarō, Mt. Oku-Shirane, Mt. Maeshirane, Mt. Omanago, Mt. Komanako, Mt.Akanagi) as well as the Kegon Falls. It covers 3,400 hectares, which is second only to the Ise Grand Shrine in area. The main shrine is located to the west of Nikkō Tōshō-gū where it was relocated to in 1617. The current shrine buildings date from that reconstruction, and 11 buildings in the complex, including the Honden, Haiden are designated as national Important Cultural Properties. The Middle Shrine is located on the shore of Lake Chuzenji. It was built in 1096; the current buildings were reconstructed in 1699. Seven buildings in the complex including the main shrine are designated as national Important Cultural Properties. The Oku-no-miya is located at the summit of Mount Nantai and was founded in 782. Archaeologists have found relics and ritual instruments from the Nara period confirming the site's age, and many of these artifacts have been designated national Important Cultural Properties.

History
The shrine was founded in 767 by Shōdō Shōnin (勝道上人), a Kegon school Buddhist priest who sought a training ground in the northern mountainous area of Shimotsuke Province. The mountain was the center of this ancient mountain cult, which merged with the Buddhist Shugendō religion  Significantly, the name  itself means "man's body". The mountain not only provides water to the rice paddies below, but has the shape of the phallic stone rods found in pre-agricultural Jōmon sites.

According to shrine legend, it was visited by Kukai, who built the Takino Shrine, and by Ennin, who built the Sanbutsu-dō, which is now the Main Hall of the temple of Rinnō-ji, and Nikko became a center for the Tendai school of Buddhism. The shrine was relocated a short distance away from the temple to its current location, and together with the original site and the Takino Shrine was collectively called the Nikkō-sansha. During the Heian period, the shrine appears in various national histories, including the 927 AD Engishiki; however, there is an ongoing controversy as to whether the Engishiki is referring to this shrine, or the Utsunomiya Futarayama Jinja. This controversy extends to the designation of ichinomiya of former Shimotsuke Province, which is likewise claimed by both shrines.

The shrine suffered during the Sengoku period as many of its estates were seized by the Late Hōjō clan and later by Toyotomi Hideyoshi; however, the construction of the Nikkō Tōshō-gū in the early Edo Period resulted in the reconstruction of the shrine by Tokugawa Hidetada and support of the shrine by many daimyō and members of the nobility.

From 1871 the shrine was officially designated  under Modern system of ranked Shinto Shrinesin State Shinto. In 1998, the grounds of the shrine were included within the National Historic Site designation the Shrines and Temples of Nikkō, which gained World Heritage Site designation the following year.

Sacred Bridge 
The  crossing the Daiya River belongs to the Futarasan Shrine. This beautiful vermilion lacquered structure is known as one of the three most beautiful bridges in Japan and is a perfect gateway for Nikko. The bridge was registered as a World Heritage in December 1999. Shinkyo measures 28 meters long, 7.4 meters wide, and stands 10.6 meters above the Daiya River.

According to legend, a priest named Shōdō and his followers climbed Mt. Nantai in the year 766 to pray for national prosperity. However, they could not cross the fast flowing Daiya River. Shōdō prayed and a 10 foot tall god named Jinja-Daiou appeared with two snakes twisted around his right arm. Jinja-Daiou released the blue and red snakes and they transformed themselves into a rainbow-like bridge covered with sedge, which Shōdō and his followers could use to cross the river. That is why this bridge is sometimes called Yamasugeno-jabashi, which means the "Snake Bridge of Sedge".

The Shinkyō has been rebuilt many times but has followed the same design pattern since 1636, when it could be used only by messengers of the Imperial court. It has been opened to the general public since 1973.

Photo gallery

See also 
 List of National Treasures of Japan (crafts-swords)
List of Shinto shrines
Ichinomiya

Notes

References 
 
 Encyclopedia of Shinto, Nikkōsan shinkō accessed on September 20, 2009
 Iwanami  Japanese dictionary, 6th Edition (2008), DVD version

External links 

 UNESCO document: Advisory Body Evaluation
 Futarasan Shrine official Web site
 Tochigi Jinja-chō
 Nikkō National Park official Web site

Beppyo shrines
Nikkō, Tochigi
Religious organizations established in the 8th century
Shinto shrines in Tochigi Prefecture
World Heritage Sites in Japan
8th-century Shinto shrines
Religious buildings and structures completed in 767
Shimotsuke Province
Ichinomiya
Historic Sites of Japan